Bjørn Tveter (born 13 June 1944) is a former Norwegian speed skater. He competed in the 1500 m event at the 1968 and 1972 Winter Olympics and finished fifth and fourth, respectively. He won a bronze medal over this distance at the 1968 World Allround Championships, placing seventh overall.

In 1973, Tveter joined the professional skating league, and in 1974 he won gold medals at the Professional European Allround Championships. The professional league was dissolved in 1974.

Tveter's younger brother Øyvind was also an Olympic speed skater.

References

External links

1944 births
Living people
Norwegian male speed skaters
Speed skaters at the 1968 Winter Olympics
Speed skaters at the 1972 Winter Olympics
Olympic speed skaters of Norway